Truly Madly Completely: The Best of Savage Garden is a compilation album released by Australian pop duo Savage Garden.

Background
The album was released worldwide on 1 November 2005, within the exception of the United States, where it was not available until 4 February 2006. The album was released to commemorate Savage Garden's tenth year in the music industry, and their overwhelming success, despite only releasing two albums—Savage Garden and Affirmation. The album was originally planned for release in 2003, containing thirteen of the band's singles, minus "Chained to You", and two bonus tracks—"All Around Me" and "I Don't Care". However, due to contractual issues, the album release was cancelled. In 2005, Hayes and Columbia records came together to organise a similar release, to be made available in the fourth quarter of 2005. Released on 1 November 2005, the album contains ten of the group's singles, all digitally remastered, in addition to five non-album B-Sides, as well as two new solo tracks from Hayes, "California" and "So Beautiful", the latter of which was released as a single on 31 October 2005, to promote the compilation. The album was made available with four different colour sleeves. A limited edition version of the album, containing a bonus DVD, was made available in Australia and Japan. The DVD contained seven music videos and a documentary video on the duo. Till August 2006, the album sold 31,000 in United States.

Track listing
"I Want You" – 3:53 from Savage Garden
"I Knew I Loved You" – 4:11 from Affirmation
"To the Moon and Back" – 5:42 from Savage Garden
"Hold Me" – 4:52 from Affirmation
"Santa Monica"  – 3:36 from Savage Garden
"Crash and Burn" – 4:42 from Affirmation
"Break Me Shake Me" – 3:25 from Savage Garden
"Truly Madly Deeply" – 4:39 from Savage Garden
"The Animal Song" – 4:39 from Affirmation
"Affirmation" – 4:58 from Affirmation
"So Beautiful" – 4:58 Previously unreleased
"California" – 6:00 Previously unreleased
"I Don't Care" – 5:05 B-Side from Affirmation
"I'll Bet He Was Cool" – 4:41 B-Side from Break Me Shake Me
"Love Can Move You" – 4:47 B-Side from Universe
"Fire Inside the Man" – 4:11 B-Side from I Want You
"This Side of Me" – 4:11 B-Side from Universe

Deluxe edition bonus DVD
"I Want You" – 3:53
"I Knew I Loved You" – 4:11
"To the Moon and Back" – 5:42
"Hold Me" – 4:52
"Crash and Burn" – 4:42
"Break Me Shake Me" – 3:25
"Truly Madly Deeply" – 4:39
"Parallel Lives" documentary – 30:00

Chart performance and certifications

Weekly charts

Year-end charts

Certifications and sales

References

2005 greatest hits albums
Savage Garden albums
Savage Garden video albums
2005 video albums
Music video compilation albums
Columbia Records compilation albums
Columbia Records video albums
Compilation albums by Australian artists